Dolerotricha is a genus of moths in the family Gelechiidae. It contains the species Dolerotricha flabellifer, which is found in Morocco.

The wingspan is about 13 mm. The forewings are ochreous-yellow with blackish-grey streaks. The hindwings are shining light grey.

References

Gelechiinae